Iris Belia Chacón Tapia (born March 7 in San Juan, Puerto Rico) is a Puerto Rican dancer, singer, actress, and entertainer. She enjoys great popularity in Puerto Rico (where she had a weekly variety show for more than a decade) and in other Latin American countries, as well as such U.S. locales as New York, Miami, and Los Angeles.

Career
Chacón has been known by various nicknames, such as "La Bomba de Puerto Rico" (The Puerto Rican Bombshell), and "La Vedette de América" (America's Showgirl). During her heyday in the 1970s and early 1980s, she toured most of Latin America, the United States, Europe and Japan. She also starred in two movies and many telenovelas, such as Yo Sé Que Mentía.

Amalie Oíl commercial

In 1982, AMCAR, Inc. hired her for a television commercial about Amalie Oil Company automobile coolant products, which became one of the most famous television commercials in Puerto Rico's history. The publicity surrounding the commercial landed her in a front-page article in The Wall Street Journal in June 1983 entitled "A Onetime Choirgirl Rules as Sex Goddess On Puerto Rican TV". The ad employed a play on words between the English word coolant and Spanish culón which means large derrière.

Mid-1980s to present
From 1984 through the early 1990s, Iris Chacón appeared on such American TV shows as America Onstage, The Joan Rivers Show, The Merv Griffin Show, Geraldo Rivera Show, and David Letterman. Letterman described her as the Dolly Parton and Loni Anderson of Puerto Rico and joked about proposing to her. Griffin said of her that "she was the answer to 'Where's the beef?'", a reference to the Wendy's commercial of that time period. However, by 1984, Chacón reached her peak, and not being able to reach an "Anglo" market, ended her show in Puerto Rico by mid-1985 at the age of 35. Her show aired in syndication until the end of the 1980s.

Outside of the U.S., Chacón appeared on various Spanish-language programs, including Anabel, Siempre en Domingo, Mala Noche No, and Al Ritmo de la Noche which were all Televisa productions.

Personal life
Chacón was married to Puerto Rican musician Junno Faria, from 1977 to Present. They have a daughter together, Katiria.  Iris divides her time between residences in Orlando and Puerto Rico.

In Popular Culture
George Pérez, a co-creator of The New Teen Titans, along with writer Marv Wolfman, has cited Chacón as an inspiration (along with Red Sonja) for the creation of Starfire, as told by George himself during an interview to Vu Nguyen during the AMAZING LAS VEGAS COMIC CON in 2019.

References

External links

1950 births
Living people
Actresses from San Juan, Puerto Rico
Singers from San Juan, Puerto Rico
20th-century Puerto Rican women singers
Puerto Rican dancers
Puerto Rican film actresses
Puerto Rican telenovela actresses
Puerto Rican television personalities
20th-century Puerto Rican actresses
21st-century Puerto Rican actresses